Vladimír Weiss may refer to:

Vladimír Weiss (footballer, born 1939) (1939–2018), former Slovak footballer
Vladimír Weiss (footballer, born 1964), his son, Slovak football coach
Vladimír Weiss (footballer, born 1989), his grandson, Slovak footballer